The Broadbeach Bowls Club is a sports complex located in Gold Coast, Queensland. It is a venue for the 2018 Commonwealth Games. It was given an upgrade completed in May 2016 that included enhancements to the four international standard bowling greens and the clubhouse and surroundings to improve access and functionality.

References

External links

2018 Commonwealth Games venues
Sports venues on the Gold Coast, Queensland
Bowls clubs
Bowls in Australia
Lawn bowls at the 2018 Commonwealth Games
Sporting clubs in Australia